Scholtzia eatoniana is a shrub species in the family Myrtaceae that is endemic to Western Australia.

It blooms between November and December producing pink-white flowers.

It is found in the Wheatbelt region of Western Australia between Tammin and Cunderdin.

References

eatoniana
Plants described in 1931